Governor Brooke may refer to:

John R. Brooke (1838–1926), Military Governor of Puerto Rico in 1898 and Military Governor of Cuba in 1899
Robert Brooke (East India Company officer) (1744–1811), Governor of the island of St Helena from 1788 to 1800
Robert Brooke Sr. (1602–1655), Colonial Governor of Maryland for several months in 1652
Thomas Brooke Jr. (1659–1730s), Acting Proprietary Governor of the Province of Maryland in 1720